Pemphigus vegetans is a localized form of pemphigus vulgaris.
in which there is a localized vegetating papillomatous response. The eroded areas do not heal like usual but form papillomatous growth and vegetation.

Accounts for 1-2% of pemphigus cases and is a relatively benign variant of pemphigus vulgaris. 
Two forms are recognized:
 Pemphigus vegetans of Neumann is a localized disease of pemphigus vulgaris slightly more extensive than pemphigus vegetans of Hallopeau.  This type is more common and characterized by early lesions similar to Pemphigus Vulgaris with large bullae and erosive areas. Healing is through formation of granulation tissue. It is named for the Austrian Dermatologist, Isidor Neumann.
 Pemphigus vegetans of Hallopeau is a disease of localized pemphigus vulgaris.  It is named for François Henri Hallopeau. This type is less aggressive and has pustules not bullae. These pustules heal by verrucous hyperkeratotic vegetations.

See also
 List of cutaneous conditions
 Pemphigus
 List of conditions caused by problems with junctional proteins

References

External links 

Chronic blistering cutaneous conditions